József Fekete (27 February 1923 – 4 August 1987) was a Hungarian gymnast, born in Kecskemét. He competed in gymnastics events at the 1948 Summer Olympics and the 1952 Summer Olympics. He won a bronze medal with the Hungarian team at the 1948 Summer Olympics.

References

External links
 

1923 births
1987 deaths
People from Kecskemét
Hungarian male artistic gymnasts
Gymnasts at the 1948 Summer Olympics
Gymnasts at the 1952 Summer Olympics
Olympic gymnasts of Hungary
Olympic bronze medalists for Hungary
Olympic medalists in gymnastics
Medalists at the 1948 Summer Olympics
Sportspeople from Bács-Kiskun County
20th-century Hungarian people